Sochos is a community and a former municipality in the Thessaloniki regional unit, Greece. Since the 2011 local government reform it is part of the municipality Lagkadas, of which it is a municipal unit. The community of Sochos covers an area of 153.042 km2 while the respective municipal unit covers an area of 281.518 km2.

Geography

Location
Sochos lies on a plateau of an altitude of about 600m above sea level, that is 15 km north of Lake Volvi. The forest area of Vertiskos Mountain begins at the outskirts of the settlement.

Administrative division
The municipal unit Sochos is subdivided into the following communities:
Sochos
Kryoneri
Askos

Population
The population of the community of Sochos was 3,093 people as of 2011. The population of the municipal unit was 5,830.

See also
Langadas

References

Populated places in Thessaloniki (regional unit)

bg:Сухо (дем)